Infante Fernando of Portugal, or Ferdinand in English, was a Portuguese infante (prince), son of King Afonso II of Portugal and his wife Urraca of Castile, daughter of Alfonso VIII of Castile.

Fernando was born in the summer of 1217 and was made Lord of Serpa and Lamego in 1223. It is known that he travelled to Rome in 1237 to beg for a pardon from Pope Gregory IX for his violence against certain clerics. He died on 19 January 1246.

Marriage and offspring
He married Sancha Fernández de Lara, daughter of Fernando Núñez de Lara and wife Mayor González, without any documented issue.

He had, however, a bastard son by an unknown woman named Sancho Fernandes de Serpa, who was a Prior at Santo Esteban de Alfama,
but had illegitimate issue, being the ancestor of the de Serpa family.

Coat of arms
In a study from the Spanish historian Faustino Menéndez-Pidal de Navascués, the infante Fernando should have used a Coat of Arms representing a Wyvern (Serpe'' in Portuguese), the symbol of his Lordship of Serpa, in south Alentejo, with a border where, alternately, are represented the arms of Portugal (paternal ancestry) and those of Castile (maternal ancestry).

Ancestors

References

Bibliography

 
 

1217 births
1246 deaths
Portuguese infantes
House of Burgundy-Portugal
13th-century Portuguese people
Sons of kings